Korso railway station is a Helsinki commuter rail station located in the district of Korso in the city of Vantaa, Finland. The station is located in the C zone of the HSL area.

Connections
 K trains (Helsinki–Kerava)
 T trains (Helsinki–Riihimäki), nighttime

Parking
The station has a parking hall with 79 spaces (maximum 12 hours). There are about 155 bicycle parking spots in the area.

References

External links

Railway stations in Vantaa